Ichthyscopus is a genus of stargazers from the family Uranoscopidae. They are ambush predators from the western Indo-Pacific region.

Species
The following species are classified as members of the genus Ichthyscopus:

Ichthyscopus barbatus Mees, 1960
Ichthyscopus fasciatus Haysom, 1957
Ichthyscopus insperatus Mees, 1960
Ichthyscopus lebeck (Bloch & Schneider, 1801)
Ichthyscopus malacopterus (Anonymous [Bennett], 1830)
Ichthyscopus nigripinnis Gomon & Johnson, 1999
Ichthyscopus sannio Whitley, 1936
Ichthyscopus spinosus Mees, 1960

References

Uranoscopidae